Atsumigawa Dam is a gravity dam located in Yamagata Prefecture in Japan. The dam is used for flood control and power production. The catchment area of the dam is 31.6 km2. The dam impounds about 390  ha of land when full and can store 5700 thousand cubic meters of water. The construction of the dam was started on 1973 and completed in 1986.

References

Dams in Yamagata Prefecture
1986 establishments in Japan